Renée Le Brun de Vielmond (born July 14, 1953 in Rio de Janeiro) is a former Brazilian actress.

After numerous successes on TV, such as the romantic Léa in Anjo Mau (1976), the aristocrat Maria Isabel Newman in Brilhante (1981), the photographer Kelly in Eu Prometo (1983), the stylist Fernanda in Novo Amor (1986), and wife deceived Aída de Barriga de Aluguel (1990), Renée returned to television, in the telenovela Gilberto Braga, Paraíso Tropical (2007), after eight years of absence due to Faculty of History.

Renée is the daughter of a Brazilian mother from the state of Alagoas and a French father.

Filmography

Television

Films 

 1969 - Em Compasso de Espera - Cristina
 1978 - Batalha dos Guararapes - Ana Paes
 1981 - Filhos e Amantes - Ruth
 1981 - Eros, o Deus do Amor - Ana III
 1991 - Os Bigodes da Aranha - Lady X
 2002 - Brilhante

References

External links 

1953 births
Living people
Actresses from Rio de Janeiro (city)
Brazilian television actresses
Brazilian telenovela actresses
Brazilian film actresses
Brazilian stage actresses
Brazilian people of French descent